A Perfect Peace is a 1982 novel by Israeli author Amos Oz that was originally published in Hebrew by Am Oved. It was translated by Hillel Halkin and published in the United States by Harcourt Brace Jovanovich in 1985.

Plot
Set in Israel during the eighteen months leading up to the Six-Day War, the novel portrays life on a fictional kibbutz, Granot, where the founding generation and their children struggle to come to terms with each other and the ideological tensions within Israeli society. Oz documents the gap between the socialist dream of the founders and the strained realities of Israeli life, but it is also, according to the author, a mystical tale about "the secret merger between six or seven very different human beings who become a family in the deepest sense of the term."

Critical reception
A Perfect Peace was hailed by Publishers Weekly as "magnificent" upon its release and described by The Washington Post Book World as Oz's "strangest, riskiest, and richest novel". It won the Bernstein Prize in 1983.

References

Further reading
Balaban, Avraham.  Between God and Beast: An Examination of Amos Oz's Prose (Penn State University Press, 1993), pp. 110–30, 211–29.
Mazor, Yair.  Somber Lust: The Art of Amos Oz, trans. Marganit Weinberger-Rotman (State University of New York Press, 2002), pp. 139–57.

1985 novels
20th-century Israeli novels
Books about the kibbutz
Novels by Amos Oz
Novels set in Israel
Jewish novels
Am Oved books